Giuseppe Finzi was one of three s built for the  (Royal Italian Navy) during the 1930s. Completed in 1936, she played a minor role in the Spanish Civil War of 1936–1939 supporting the Spanish Nationalists. The submarine made multiple patrols in the Atlantic Ocean during the Second World War, sinking five Allied ships. Gisueppe Finzi began conversion into a transport submarine in 1943, but was captured by the Germans in September 1943 before it was completed and redesignated as UIT-21. She was scuttled by them in August 1944 to prevent her capture.

Design and description 
The Calvi class was an improved and enlarged version of the preceding  submarine cruisers. They displaced  surfaced and  submerged. Their crew numbered 77 officers and enlisted men.

For surface running, the boats were powered by two  diesel engines, each driving one propeller shaft. When submerged each propeller was driven by a  electric motor. They could reach  on the surface and  underwater.

The boats were armed with eight  torpedo tubes, four each in the bow and in the stern for which they carried a total of 16 torpedoes. They were also armed with a pair of  deck guns, one each fore and aft of the conning tower, for combat on the surface. Their anti-aircraft armament consisted of two twin-gun mounts for  machine guns.

Construction and career 
Giuseppe Finzi (pennant number FZ) was laid down by Odero-Terni-Orlando (OTO) at their Muggiano, La Spezia shipyard in 1932,  launched on 29 June 1935 and completed the following year. While patrolling off Valencia during the Spanish Civil War, the submarine unsuccessfully attacked a Republican  during a patrol on 15 August–4 September 1937. During that same patrol she later missed a merchant ship with two torpedoes.

The first patrol during the Second World War was from Cagliari to the Atlantic, and lasted from 5 June to 10 July 1940. The submarine sailed on 7 September 1940 and passed the Strait of Gibraltar on 13 September for an Atlantic patrol to Bordeaux, France, on 29 September. The German Admiral Karl Dönitz visited Giuseppe Finzi on 30 September to welcome  sailors to the German base. The third patrol near the British Isles from 24 October to 4 December 1940 revealed that the diesel engine air intake was too exposed for North Atlantic winter weather.  The fourth patrol was near the Canary Islands from 10 March to 17 April 1941 and the fifth patrol was off Gibraltar in August. During the sixth patrol from 7 to 29 December 1941 , Giuseppe Finzi and  rescued sailors of the sunken German commerce raider . The submarine sailed for Operation Neuland on 6 February 1942 and returned on 31 March. She returned to the Caribbean Sea for an eighth patrol from 6 June to 18 August 1942. On 26 November 1942 Giuseppe Finzi sailed for a ninth patrol to Brazil; but mechanical problems required return to base on 10 December. The boat patrolled the West African coast from 11 February to 18 April 1943. Conversion to a transport submarine was never completed, and the boat was seized by the Germans on 9 September 1943 when Italy surrendered to the Allies. Renamed UIT21 in German service, she was scuttled at Le Verdon-sur-Mer on 25 August 1944 to pprevent her capture by advancing Allied forces.

Notes

References 

 
 
 

uboat.net Giuseppe Finzi (FZ, I.2) Finzi Accessed 2 May 2022

External links 
 Giuseppe Finzi Marina Militare website

Calvi-class submarines
Ships built in Italy
1935 ships
World War II submarines of Italy
Shipwrecks of France
Maritime incidents in September 1943
Maritime incidents in August 1944
Scuttled vessels